Giorgia Motta is an Italian football defender, currently playing for Torres CF in Serie A. She has also played for Bardolino CF in Serie A and AD Torrejón in the Spanish Superleague. She has played the Champions League with Bardolino and Torres.

She is a member of the Italian national team, taking part in the 2009 European Championship's squad.

References

1984 births
Living people
Italian women's footballers
Italy women's international footballers
Italian expatriate sportspeople in Spain
Expatriate women's footballers in Spain
Primera División (women) players
Serie A (women's football) players
A.S.D. AGSM Verona F.C. players
Torres Calcio Femminile players
Footballers from Verona
Women's association football defenders
Italian expatriate women's footballers
AD Torrejón CF Femenino players
Fiorentina Women's F.C. players
Hellas Verona Women players
21st-century Italian women